The 1996 Northern Arizona Lumberjacks football team was an American football team that represented Northern Arizona University (NAU) as a member of the Big Sky Conference (Big Sky) during the 1996 NCAA Division I-AA football season. The team compiled a 9–3 record and was No. 6 in the NCAA Division I-AA playoff participant rankings. Running back Archie Amerson won the Walter Payton Award as the most outstanding offensive player in NCAA Division I-AA football.

Season overview
In their seventh year under head coach Steve Axman, the Lumberjacks compiled a 9–3 record (6–1 against conference opponents), outscored opponents by a total of 506 to 333, and finished second out of nine teams in the Big Sky. The team played its home games at the J. Lawrence Walkup Skydome, commonly known as the Walkup Skydome, in Flagstaff, Arizona.

During the regular season, the team lost only two games, one against Division I-A New Mexico (33–49) and the other to No. 2 Montana (32–48).

The Lumberjacks were invited to play in the 1996 NCAA Division I-AA playoffs. In the program's first ever Division I-AA playoff game, they lost to Furman by a 42–31 score before a crowd of 8,700 at the Walkup Skydome.

Statistical leaders and records
The team was led on offense by running back Archie Amerson. He rushed for 2,079 yards and 25 rushing touchdowns (both NAU records) and received the Walter Payton Award as the most outstanding offensive player in NCAA Division I-AA football. He had six 200-yard rushing games during the 1996 season, and his single-game totals of 289 yards against Portland State and 281 yards against Weber State rank among the top 10 rushing games in NAU history.  His seven rushing touchdowns against Weber State established a Division I-AA record.

Quarterback Travis Brown also had a record-breaking season with 3,398 passing yards (then a school record) and also set NAU single-game records with 474 passing yards against Montana and seven passing touchdowns against Sacramento State. 

Ricky Pearsall also set a Division I-AA record with 216 punt return yards against Western New Mexico.

The 1996 team also set the school's single-season scoring record with 63 touchdowns. Its 75-0 win over Western New Mexico was the largest point total and largest margin of victory in school history.

Schedule

References

Northern Arizona
Northern Arizona Lumberjacks football seasons
Northern Arizona Lumberjacks football